State Route 185 (SR 185) is a  state highway located in the southeastern part of the U.S. state of Georgia. It lies entirely within Charlton County.

Route description
The highway begins at an intersection with SR 23/SR 121 at a point just north of the Florida state line (and near their southernmost point in the state). It heads northwest, skirting the nearby Florida state line to its west. County Road 120 (CR 120) is accessible via Reynolds Bridge Road. SR 185 continues to the northwest, through rural areas, until it meets its northern terminus, an intersection with SR 94. Geographically, it is the second-southernmost state highway in the state, after SR 23/SR 121, which have their southern terminus just a little further south than SR 185.

Major intersections

See also

References

External links

 
 Georgia Roads (Routes 181 - 200)
 Georgia State Route 185 on State-Ends.com

185
Transportation in Charlton County, Georgia